You Zhang (born 2 March 2000) is a Chinese draughts player (International draughts), who ranked first at the 2015 Asian Women's Draughts Championship. She took place in 2012 World Mind Sports Games (31 place), in 2015 Women's World Draughts Championship (13 place),in 2019 Women's World Draughts Championship (9 place). You Zhang is a Women's International grandmaster (GMIF).

References

Sources
 Profile, FMJD

2000 births
Living people
Chinese draughts players
Players of international draughts